The Krempachy Marl Formation  is a geological formation in Poland and Slovakia, dating to about 179 million years ago, and covering the middle Toarcian stage of the Jurassic Period. It is among the most important formations of the Toarcian boundary on the Carpathian realm, being the regional equivalent of the Posidonia Shale.

The formation has been considered as following the model of the Fleckenmergel Marl, without macroscopic paleodepths implicated on the processes. The facies of the formation developed on the Pieniny Klippen Basin, being influenced by the widespread of the Late Liassic Tethys. The formation was a succession of nearshore to epicontinental deposits, with several of the only Toarcian terrestrial deposits know from the Bohemian Massif. It also gives one of the few limited insights into paleoceanographic changes that took place in this  area during this key time interval.

Geology 
The Pieniny Klippen Belt represents an axial tectonic zone on the West Carpathians, with a narrow structure, that extends a several hundred kilometers long structural zone belonging to the Carpathian sector of the Alpide belt, and separates the Outher Carpathian and the Central Carpathian. While the Pliensbachian-Toarcian boundary is nearly unknown on the Belt, the Toarcian to Bajocian succession is present on various points. The belt is a Laramian Front inside the Central Carpathian Orogenic Wedge, that had a re-folded along with an strong compressed process during the Alpine thrusting of the Outer Carpathians in the Neogene. The belt has a series of lithofacies patterns that recover from the Middle Jurassic to the Lower Cretaceous paleogeographical changes on the east Bohemian Massif margin, and reflects a paleobathymetric gradient change, that was developed around the Czorsztyn Swell de to a crustal block of Oravicum, correlated to the contemporaneous Briançonnais. The Toarcian basin was located to the north of Oravicum, being on the NE of the North European Shelf. It was an areas that suffered from Middle Jurassic that would have ended forming the Magura Basin. After that, sedimentary infill was translated northward to the nearshore platforms, and then formed nappe structures and flysch mélange. The view and reconstruction of the sedimentary basins on the Toarcian realm is very complicated, since they lost their original geometry due to tectonic works and deformations on the Noegene, abundant  allochthonous material and several hiatus on the strata.

Sedimentology 
The strata of the formation is composed by grey-blue marl & limestones. The formation overlies Sinemurian to Pliensbachian deposits of the Orava Unit, where there is disposed a southwest bedding dipping. The lowermost part of the strata recovers spotted limestone beds & alternations of dark Marls that are equivalent to the  uppermost Allgäu Formation. Over the marls there is a series of dark shales that had intercalated siltstones, that mark the start of the main Krempachy Marl Formation. The marls of the main formation strata are covered on Ammonite fragments, intercalated with Dinoflagellates. There is a condensation of the Lower-Middle Toarcian deposits throughout the Western Carpathians. As that, in the  Pieniny Klippen Belt, sections like the Tenuicostatum and Serpentinum zones of the early Toarcian are or completely missing or strongly condensed. Altroght sections such as Zázrivá A provide the first record of the T-OAE from all Western Carpathians. Zázrivá A has an expressure of 36 m, oriented to the Southwest.

Lithology 
The Krempachy Marl is rich in black shales in its lowermost parts, that are locally rich in macrofauna, including ammonites, soft bodied cephalopods, bivalves, crustaceans and fish remains. Manganese mineralization is also common in the oldest part, something shared with most of the coeval Alpine Tethys successions. Due to that, there is a high concentration of Mn contents (6 to 10 wt%). Typical Toarcian sections of the Orava Succession are represented by condensed red marls, marly limestones, and/or red nodular limestones, being locally rich in ammonites.

Fossil content 
Geochemical, palynological  and mineralogical framboid data show that dysoxic to euxinic conditions occurred in an epicontinental basin located close to the Tethys open-ocean during the T-OAE, and continued after it. Organic-rich sedimentation and anoxic conditions were clearly shorter-lived in the southern basins, where evidence for elevated organic carbon burial is generally restricted to the CIE. There are results that indicate poor oxygenation, elevated carbon and sulfur burial developed in basins located very close to the open-ocean masses of the Tethys Ocean, similar to modern large euxinic basins. The basin was located between Oravicum, with an initial area of ~100,000 square kilometers, and the NW-European shelf and has been associated with considerable amounts of sulfur and carbon during the T-OAE. The presence of brown wood traces has been interpreted as reflecting the proximity of land areas, with fluvial run-off supplying fresh phytoclasts. Although most of the basin lacks unequivocal palynological evidence for brackish conditions, such as the freshwater green algae Botryococcus, being related to effects due to changes in oxygenation.

Megaspores

Cephalophoda

See also 
 List of fossiliferous stratigraphic units in Poland
 List of fossiliferous stratigraphic units in Slovakia
 Toarcian turnover
 Toarcian formations
Marne di Monte Serrone, Italy
 Calcare di Sogno, Italy
 Mizur Formation, North Caucasus
 Sachrang Formation, Austria
 Saubach Formation, Austria
 Úrkút Manganese Ore Formation, Hungary
 Posidonia Shale, Lagerstätte in Germany
 Ciechocinek Formation, Germany and Poland
 Djupadal Formation, Central Skane
 Lava Formation, Lithuania
 Azilal Group, North Africa
 Whitby Mudstone, England
 Fernie Formation, Alberta and British Columbia
 Poker Chip Shale
 Whiteaves Formation, British Columbia
 Navajo Sandstone, Utah
 Los Molles Formation, Argentina
 Mawson Formation, Antarctica
 Kandreho Formation, Madagascar
 Kota Formation, India
 Cattamarra Coal Measures, Australia

References 

Geologic formations of Poland
Geologic formations of Slovakia
Jurassic System of Europe
Toarcian Stage
Marl formations
Open marine deposits
Fossiliferous stratigraphic units of Europe
Formations